The Roman Catholic Diocese of Cubao (Latin: Dioecesis Cubaoensis) is a diocese of the western Latin Church of the Catholic Church in district of Cubao in Quezon City, in northern Metro Manila, Philippines.   The diocese was created by Pope John Paul II on June 28, 2003 from the ecclesiastical district of Cubao of the Roman Catholic Archdiocese of Manila. It was canonically erected on August 28, 2003, with the installation of Honesto Flores Ongtioco as the first Bishop of Cubao.

The diocese is composed of 45 full parishes including three national shrines, two minor basilicas; two quasi-parishes; one non-parochial diocesan shrine; and one mission station. These are clustered into six separate vicariates.

History
On December 3, 1974, Manila Archbishop Jaime Sin divided Quezon City into four vicariates: the Vicariates of Santa Rita, of Holy Family, of Saint Joseph, and of Santo Nino.

On August 10, 1987, the ecclesiastical district of Quezon City was divided into two: Quezon City-North and Quezon City-South. On March 15, 2002, the district's territories were revised and the southern district renamed the ecclesiastical district of Cubao. Manila Auxiliary Bishop Socrates Villegas became the district bishop with Monsignor Daniel Santa Maria as its episcopal vicar.

On June 28, 2003, Pope John Paul II signed the papal bull Quo Satius Provideretur and the district was made a diocese, along with the Roman Catholic Diocese of Kalookan and Roman Catholic Diocese of Pasig. Honesto F. Ongtioco, Bishop of the Roman Catholic Diocese of Balanga, was named its first bishop and was formally installed on August 28, 2003. The Immaculate Conception Parish at 39 Lantana Street, Barangay Immaculate Conception, Cubao, Quezon City, became the Cubao Cathedral and seat of the diocese.

Territorial jurisdiction
The diocese comprises the southern part of Quezon City, starting from Tandang Sora Avenue and Mactan Street leading throughout the south of the city, particularly the three legislative districts of the city in the south: District 1 (all barangays), District 3 (except Barangays Camp Aguinaldo, Matandang Balara and EDSA Shrine in Brgy. Ugong Norte along EDSA-Ortigas), and District 4 (except the lower part of Barangay Bagong Lipunan ng Crame). In addition to, it comprises some barangays in District 6, namely Sangandaan, Baesa, Apolonio Samson, Unang Sigaw, Balon-bato (or Balumbato), New Era, and portions of Culiat and Tandang Sora that are found on the southern portion across Tandang Sora Avenue. Two of the institutions operated and owned by the Archdiocese of Manila are located within the diocese's jurisdiction which are Radio Veritas 846 and EDSA Shrine.

Camp Aguinaldo and the portion of Camp Crame south of Bonny Serrano Avenue, with Veterans Memorial Medical Center along North Avenue, Project 6, are under the jurisdiction of the Military Ordinariate of the Philippines, whereas Barangay Matandang Balara under the Diocese of Novaliches.

Ordinaries

Arms

See also 

Catholic Church in the Philippines
Parish of the Holy Sacrifice
Sacred Heart Parish Kamuning
Santuario de San Pedro Bautista
Our Lady of La Naval de Manila

References

External links
 
 Our Lady of Pentecost Parish 
 Transfiguration of Our Lord Parish
 San Antonio de Padua Parish

Roman Catholic dioceses in the Philippines
Roman Catholic Ecclesiastical Province of Manila
Christian organizations established in 2003
Roman Catholic dioceses and prelatures established in the 21st century
Quezon City